Andrew J. Smith is a songwriter and musician. He has written and released charting songs including "We're All Gonna Die" (Top 50 in Alternative Radio, USA - Pollstar, week of December 26, 2022) and been a featured guest on The Kelly Clarkson Show and Good Day Atlanta.

AJ Smith received a scholarship from the Songwriters Hall of Fame to attend New York University, where he studied Music Composition. At NYU, Smith won Best Solo Original at the Thomas Ellett UltraViolet Live Talent Competition.

While still at NYU, Smith was a student of Glenn Frey of the Eagles. In November 2012, Smith opened for the Eagles at the Beacon Theatre in New York City.

Smith's feature on 2013's Royaal & Venuto's "Summertime feat. AJ Smith (DubVision Remix)" finished as the #19 song of the year on the Australia ARIA Club Charts.

References 

21st-century American musicians
Year of birth missing (living people)
Living people
Place of birth missing (living people)
American songwriters
New York University alumni